Hampton Downtown Historic District is a national historic district located at Hampton, Virginia. The district encompasses 25 contributing buildings and 7 contributing sites in the central business district of Hampton.  The district includes a variety of commercial, residential, institutional, and governmental buildings dating from the late-19th to mid-20th century.  There are notable examples of the Beaux-Arts, Art Deco, and Gothic Revival styles.  Notable buildings include First United Methodist Church (1887, 1931), the Sclater Building (1871), St. Tammany's Masonic Lodge (1888), Hampton Baptist Church (1883), Old Hampton Station Post Office (1914), and the circuit courthouse (1876).  Located in the district and separately listed are St. John's Episcopal Church (1728) and the former Hampton City Hall (1939).

It was listed on the National Register of Historic Places in 2010.

References

National Register of Historic Places in Hampton, Virginia
Beaux-Arts architecture in Virginia
Art Deco architecture in Virginia
Gothic Revival architecture in Virginia
Historic districts on the National Register of Historic Places in Virginia
Buildings and structures in Hampton, Virginia